Cullison is a city in Pratt County, Kansas, United States.  As of the 2020 census, the population of the city was 83.

History
Cullison was a station and shipping point on the Chicago, Rock Island and Pacific Railroad. Cullison was named for John B. and Mary M. Cullison, original owners of the town site.

A post office was opened in Cullison in 1885, and remained in operation until it was discontinued in 1967.

Geography
Cullison is located at  (37.630820, -98.905786).

Demographics

2010 census
As of the census of 2010, there were 101 people, 37 households, and 28 families residing in the city. The racial makeup of the city was 94.1% White, 3.0% from other races, and 3.0% from two or more races. Hispanic or Latino of any race were 3.0% of the population.

There were 37 households, of which 35.1% had children under the age of 18 living with them, 62.2% were married couples living together, 2.7% had a female householder with no husband present, 10.8% had a male householder with no wife present, and 24.3% were non-families. 21.6% of all households were made up of individuals, and 5.4% had someone living alone who was 65 years of age or older. The average household size was 2.73 and the average family size was 3.14.

The median age in the city was 31.8 years. 28.7% of residents were under the age of 18; 10.8% were between the ages of 18 and 24; 23.8% were from 25 to 44; 24.7% were from 45 to 64; and 11.9% were 65 years of age or older. The gender makeup of the city was 58.4% male and 41.6% female.

2000 census
As of the census of 2000, there were 98 people, 43 households, and 27 families residing in the city. The racial makeup of the city was 90.82% White, 5.10% from other races, and 4.08% from two or more races. Hispanic or Latino of any race were 8.16% of the population.

There were 43 households, out of which 25.6% had children under the age of 18 living with them, 60.5% were married couples living together, 4.7% had a female householder with no husband present, and 34.9% were non-families. 34.9% of all households were made up of individuals, and 16.3% had someone living alone who was 65 years of age or older. The average household size was 2.28 and the average family size was 2.96.

In the city, the population was spread out, with 21.4% under the age of 18, 11.2% from 18 to 24, 18.4% from 25 to 44, 28.6% from 45 to 64, and 20.4% who were 65 years of age or older. The median age was 45 years. For every 100 females, there were 108.5 males. For every 100 females age 18 and over, there were 108.1 males.

The median income for a household in the city was $20,625, and the median income for a family was $31,250. Males had a median income of $26,000 versus $12,083 for females. The per capita income for the city was $15,508. There were 13.0% of families and 9.9% of the population living below the poverty line, including no under eighteens and none of those over 64.

References

Further reading

External links
 Cullison - Directory of Public Officials
 USD 438, local school district
 A Brief History of Cullison
 Cullison city map, KDOT

Cities in Kansas
Cities in Pratt County, Kansas